Leslie Norman Evans (13 October 1929 – April 2007) was an English professional footballer who played as a winger.

Career
After playing for Brierley Hill Alliance, Evans joined Football League side Cardiff City. However, the presence of George Edwards restricted his appearances, playing in three league matches and scoring once. He later joined Plymouth Argyle but failed to break into the first team.

References

1929 births
2007 deaths
English footballers
Brierley Hill Alliance F.C. players
Cardiff City F.C. players
Plymouth Argyle F.C. players
English Football League players
Association football wingers